Enoch Oteng (born 8 July 1988 in Brussels) is a Belgian footballer, who currently plays for Cappellen FC. He is of Ghanaian descent.

Career 
Oteng began his career 1998 with VAV Beerschot. After merger named: Germinal Beerschot. He served Germinal Beerschot in the Jupiler League for one year and joined  Verbroedering Geel in July 2007. He was released by his club in January 2009 and joined to Greek side AE Larissa. After he plays with V.C. Herentals the season 2009–2010. At the end he quit there and go plays for fun in an Antwerp pubteam. He joined than in summer 2010 to Dutch side VV Axel., before in Juni 2011 returned to Belgium and signed for K. Merksem SC.

Personal life 
Oteng is of Ghanaian descent and his parents are Belgian immigrants from Accra.

References

External links
 
 

1988 births
Living people
Belgian footballers
Association football midfielders
Belgian people of Ghanaian descent
Black Belgian sportspeople
Beerschot A.C. players
Footballers from Brussels
Expatriate footballers in the Netherlands
Athlitiki Enosi Larissa F.C. players
Expatriate footballers in Greece